Ali Suavi (8 December 1839 – 20 May 1878) was an Ottoman Turk political activist, journalist, educator, theologian and reformer.  He was exiled to Kastamonu because of his writings against Ottoman Sultan Abdülaziz. He is one of the first Pan-Turkists in the Ottoman period.

Biography
He taught at an elementary school in Bursa, preached at the Sehzade Mosque in Constantinople (now Istanbul), wrote for Filip (Philip) Efendi’s newspaper Muhbir, and worked in different positions at offices in Simav, Plovdiv, and Sofia. He was a member of the Young Ottomans and editor of its official journal. He was also one of the contributors of pan-Islamist newspaper Basiret.

Having a predominantly religious education, Suavi was an Islamic radical who was placed in charge of the first Young Ottoman publication to appear in Europe, Muhbir. The newspaper eventually became an embarrassment to the Young Ottomans, and soon thereafter, fellow Young Ottomans Namık Kemal and Ziya Pasha requested that Suavi remove the Young Ottoman association with the publication. Suavi drifted around to various cities and grew bitter against the Young Ottomans, eventually leading him to begin publishing a periodical that lambasted both the republican Young Ottomans and the monarchist Ottoman Sultan's government alike as enemies of the people. In 1867 he escaped prosecution by fleeing to Paris where he stayed until Abdülaziz was dethroned in 1876. Despite his opposition to the contemporary Sultan's government, Suavi's writings showed great respect to the institution of the Sultan, which in his belief would best be filled, for the common good of the people, by an enlightened absolutist.

After the conservative Abdul Hamid II became sultan, Suavi attempted a coup in 1878 in an attempt to end the increasing authoritarianism and reinstall Murad V, who had been sympathetic to liberal ideals. The coup failed and Ali Suavi was killed in the attempt.

Publications
A Propos de L'Herzegovine (Regarding Herzegovina, Paris, 1876)
Ali Paşa'nın Siyaseti (The Politics of Ali Paşa, 1908)
Defter-i Âmâl-i Ali Paşa (Defter-i Amal-i* of Ali Paşa, Paris, ?)
Devlet Yüz On Altı Buçuk Milyon Borçtan Kurtuluyor (The Government Gets Out of a One Hundred and *Sixteen and a Half Million Debt, Paris, 1875)
Hive (Hive, Paris 1874, İstanbul 1910)
Hukuku'ş-Şevari (Ways of the Law, translation from Gazali, 1808)
Montenegro (Montenegro, Paris, 1876)
Nesayih-i Ebu Hanife Kamusu'l Ulûm Vel Maârif (Nesayih-i Ebu Hanife, Dictionary of Science and *Education, an unfinished essay of encyclopedia, 1870)
Saydu'l Mefkûd (The Lost Prey, 2 volumes)
Taharriyat-ı Suavi alâ Tarih-i Türk (The Research of Suavi on Turkish History)
Usul-i Fıkıh Nam Risalenin Tercümesi (Translation of the Pamphlet named Methodology of the Canon Law, London, 1868)

Further reading
  - PhD thesis at the Institute of Islamic Studies, McGill University - Profile

References

Further reading
 

19th-century journalists from the Ottoman Empire
19th-century writers from the Ottoman Empire
1839 births
1878 deaths
People from Çankırı
Turks from the Ottoman Empire